Allan A. Lamport Stadium is a multi-purpose stadium on King Street West in the Liberty Village neighbourhood of Toronto, Ontario, Canada. It is the practice facility for the Toronto Argonauts of the Canadian Football League.  It is also partial home for Canada national rugby league team.  The playing surface of the 9,600 seating capacity stadium is also dually marked for soccer and field hockey. The stadium was named for long-time Toronto politician Allan Lamport, who was associated with sporting activities in the city.

History
Lamport Stadium was built during the winter and spring of 1974–1975 on the site of the Andrew Mercer Reformatory for Women, and opened on July 1, 1975. 

As part of a deal with the city to convert BMO Field to natural grass, Maple Leaf Sports & Entertainment spent  adding a winter bubble to Lamport Stadium in the winter of 2009–2010.  MLSE manages the operations of the facility during the winter season, when the field is covered by the dome and community soccer programs are held.

Facilities
Since opening in 1975, the playing surface has been artificial turf. Lamport Stadium's indoor field measures 68 metres by 105 metres, allowing a full eleven-a-side game.

Sports usage

Canadian football
The home games of the semi-professional American football team Toronto Athletics Football Team were played at the stadium from 1993 to 1996. The team provided players looking to keep playing sought to be scouted by professional gridiron football teams. The Athletics won the Mid-Continental League Championship in 1993, and was ranked as high as 9th over all in the American Semi Professional Football Rankings in 1995.

In 2018, the professional Canadian football team, the CFL's Toronto Argonauts, announced that they would use the stadium as their practice facility.

Lacrosse
The Toronto Nationals played their 2010 season at Lamport Stadium before moving to Hamilton.

Soccer
Since the opening of Lamport Stadium the National Soccer League used the stadium as a home venue for many of its clubs based in Toronto. Both SC Toronto and Major League Soccer team Toronto FC's Academy side played their Canadian Soccer League home games at Lamport Stadium.  The OUA's Ryerson Rams soccer teams also call the stadium home. In 2014, the Serbian White Eagles of the Canadian Soccer League and Internacional de Toronto of League1 Ontario also played their home games at the stadium. Toronto FC II announced in August 2017 that it would move its home games from the Ontario Soccer Centre to BMO Field and Lamport Stadium beginning with the 2018 season. However, with their drop to the division 3 USL League One for the 2019 season, the team moved their home games to BMO Training Ground. The University of Toronto Schools high school team also uses Lamport Stadium as a practice field and for home games.

Rugby league
On 21 May 2012, it was announced that Lamport Stadium would be the new home of the Canada national rugby league team, the Wolverines. Their first game of 2013, the Colonial Cup opener against the United States national rugby league team saw a crowd of nearly 8,000 turn out to witness a comeback from the Wolverines.

The stadium also hosted a professional rugby league club, the Toronto Wolfpack, which began playing there in 2017.  

On May 18, 2019, Lamport hosted the inaugural Americas 9s tournament.

International matches

Rugby union
In January 2019, Major League Rugby expansion team, the Toronto Arrows announced that they would split home games between Lamport Stadium and Alumni Field at York University for their inaugural season.  They were scheduled to play games at the stadium in 2020, but the season was canceled due to the COVID-19 pandemic.  The team moved their home games to York Lions Stadium for the 2022 season.

Non-sports usage
Besides sporting events, the stadium also hosts a major Caribana event each summer: the crowning ceremony for the King and Queen of Caribana.

Homeless Encampment
The area around the stadium became a homeless encampment for a period of time, but was cleared by police and city staff on July 21, 2021, resulting in arrests of both homeless people who had been staying there and protestors standing in solidarity with them. Images of police activity from the incident was heavily circulated on various social media platforms as well as getting coverage from a variety of news outlets

See also

List of rugby league stadiums by capacity
Rugby league in Canada

References

Parks in Toronto
Soccer venues in Ontario
Rugby union stadiums in Ontario
Rugby league stadiums in Canada
Sports venues in Toronto
Multi-purpose stadiums in Canada
SC Toronto
Sports venues completed in 1975
Toronto FC
Toronto Wolfpack
Toronto Arrows
Toronto FC II
Maple Leaf Sports & Entertainment
Lacrosse venues
Former Major League Lacrosse venues
1975 establishments in Ontario
USL League One stadiums
Major League Rugby stadiums
Toronto Arrows stadiums